The Verdaguer House Museum is a literary museum in Folgueroles, birthplace of poet Jacint Verdaguer, in the region of Osona. It was opened in 1967 and is part of the Barcelona Provincial Council Local Museum Network.

Building
The Verdaguer House Museum is located in a 17th-century house occupied by Josep Verdaguer and his wife, Josepa Santaló, (parents of Jacint Verdaguer) between 1841 and 1847, when the poet was two years old.

Exhibition
The exhibition area is structured on three floors: on the first floor is the permanent exhibition, which takes visitors through the stages of the poet's life; the second floor shows what a typical kitchen and bedroom were decorated like in the 19th century, time in which young Jacint lived; on the third floor there is a space dedicated to temporary exhibitions and another to the artist Perejaume, as well as an audiovisual presentation on the life and work of Jacint Verdaguer.

See also 
 Jacint Verdaguer

References

External links

 Official site
 Amics de Verdaguer's blog
 Espais Escrits
 Local Museum Network site

Barcelona Provincial Council Local Museum Network
Osona
Literary museums in Spain
Jacint Verdaguer
Historic house museums in Catalonia
Museums established in 1967
1967 establishments in Spain

ca:Museu d'Art de Cerdanyola